Csongrád-Csanád is the name of an administrative county (comitatus or vármegye) in southern Hungary, straddling the river Tisza, on the border with Serbia and Romania. It shares borders with the Hungarian counties Bács-Kiskun County, Jász-Nagykun-Szolnok County and Békés. The administrative centre of Csongrád-Csanád county is Szeged. The county is also part of the Danube–Criș–Mureș–Tisa Euroregion.

History
On October 3, 2017, the Hungarian Parliament passed a resolution to rename Csongrád County to Csongrád-Csanád County, which took effect on June 4, 2020. The resolution was submitted by János Lázár, then-Minister of the Prime Minister's Office, who called the renaming symbolic as more than a dozen settlements in the area still share Csanád County's identity.

Geography
This county has a total area of  – 4,58% of Hungary.

The area of Csongrád-Csanád County is flat. It has a high number of sunshine hours and excellent soil, which makes it the most important agricultural area of Hungary. Its most famous products are paprika from Szeged and onions from Makó, but grain, vegetables, and fruits are also significant. Half of the onions, paprika, and vegetables produced in Hungary are from Csongrád-Csanád. The county is also rich in oil and natural gas.

The highest point is Ásotthalom (125 m), the lowest is Gyálarét (78 m; lowest point of Hungary).

Neighbours
 Jász-Nagykun-Szolnok County in the North.
 Békés County in the East.
 Bács-Kiskun County in the West.

Demographics

After the end of the Ottoman occupation in 1715, the county was nearly uninhabited, with a population density of less than 5/km2. In the 18th and 19th centuries, the county was repopulated by ethnic Hungarians from the relatively overpopulated northern and western counties of the Kingdom of Hungary. According to the 2001 census, the county is home for 423,826 people (216,936 people live in urban counties) with a population density is 100/km2. It has a Hungarian majority.

In 2015, it had a population of 406,205 and the population density was 95/km².

Ethnicity
Besides the Hungarian majority, the main minorities are the Roma (approx. 5,000), Romanian (1,500), German (1,300) and Serb (1,300).

Total population (2011 census): 417,456
Ethnic groups (2011 census):
Identified themselves: 367,193 persons:
Hungarians: 355,554 (96.83%)
Gypsies: 4,720 (1.29%)
Others and indefinable: 6,919 (1.88%)

Approximately 59,000 persons in Csongrád-Csanád County did not declare their ethnic group on the 2011 census.

Religion

Religious adherence in the county according to the 2011 census:

Catholic – 165,955 (Roman Catholic – 164,060; Greek Catholic – 1,855);
Reformed – 29,289; 
Evangelical – 3,488;
Orthodox – 923;
Judaism – 263;
Other religions – 7,278; 
Non-religious – 90,836; 
Atheism – 6,585;
Undeclared – 112,839.

Regional structure

Transport

Road network 

In 2012, Csongrád-Csanád County had a dense network of public roads, in total length of 1,350 km, of which 281 km were main roads. Inland, connections were provided by 1,049 km of county and communal roads and 20 km were covered with light road surfaces.

Highway network
  runs from Budapest to Röszke (Serbian border). ~ 47 km 
 runs from Szombathely to Szeged. (planned)
  runs from Szeged to Csanádpalota (Romanian border). - 58 km

Road network
 runs from Budapest to Röszke (Serbian border), via Kistelek and Szeged. - 52 km
 runs from Szeged to Nagylak (Romanian border), via Makó. - 55 km
 runs from Makó to Hódmezővásárhely. - 30 km
 runs from Makó to Kiszombor (Romanian border). - 6 km
 runs from Kunszentmárton to Hódmezővásárhely, via Szentes. - 43 km
 runs from Szeged to Debrecen, via Hódmezővásárhely.
 runs from Szeged to Bátaszék, via Mórahalom.
 runs from Kiskunfélegyháza to Szentes, via Csongrád.
 western bypass of Szeged.

Politics

County Assembly

The Csongrád-Csanád County Council, elected at the 2019 local government elections, is made up of 20 counselors, with the following party composition:

Presidents of the County Assembly

Members of the National Assembly
The following members elected of the National Assembly during the 2022 parliamentary election:

Municipalities 
Csongrád-Csanád County has 2 urban counties, 8 towns, 7 large villages and 43 villages.

As a typical Great Plain county, Csongrád-Csanád has a relatively small number of municipalities. 72.5% of the population lives in cities/towns, so it is one of the most urbanized county in Hungary.

Cities with county rights
(ordered by population, as of 2011 census)
Szeged (168,048) – county seat
Hódmezővásárhely (46,047)

Towns

Szentes (28,509)
Makó (23,683)
Csongrád (17,242)
Sándorfalva (7,871)
Kistelek (7,103)
Mindszent (6,914)
Mórahalom (5,804)
Csanádpalota (2,923)

Villages

Algyő 
Ambrózfalva
Apátfalva
Árpádhalom
Ásotthalom 
Baks
Balástya
Bordány
Csanádalberti
Csanytelek
Csengele
Derekegyház
Deszk
Domaszék
Dóc
Eperjes
Fábiánsebestyén
Felgyő
Ferencszállás
Forráskút
Földeák
Királyhegyes
Kiszombor 
Klárafalva
Kövegy
Kübekháza
Magyarcsanád
Maroslele
Mártély
Nagyér
Nagylak
Nagymágocs 
Nagytőke
Óföldeák
Ópusztaszer 
Öttömös
Pitvaros
Pusztamérges
Pusztaszer
Röszke
Ruzsa
Szatymaz
Szegvár 
Székkutas
Tiszasziget
Tömörkény
Újszentiván
Üllés
Zákányszék
Zsombó

 municipalities are large villages.

Gallery

References

External links

 Official site in Hungarian
 Délmagyarország (delmagyar.hu) - The county portal

 
Counties of Hungary